Hawkins Avenue Historic District is a national historic district located at Sanford, Lee County, North Carolina. It encompasses 200 contributing buildings and 4 contributing structures in a predominantly residential section of Sanford.  The district includes notable examples of Colonial Revival and Queen Anne style architecture, with buildings largely dated between about 1900 to the 1930s.  Located in the district is the separately listed Sanford High School, Former.  Other notable buildings include the John McIver House (1880s), Duncan E. McIver House (1893), Malcolm D. McNeill House (c. 1903), E.L. Gavin House (1922), First Presbyterian Church of Sanford (1914), First Baptist Church (1925), the former Sanford Cotton Mill complex, and the Liles Bonded Cotton Warehouse (c. 1920).

It was listed on the National Register of Historic Places in 2000.

References

Historic districts on the National Register of Historic Places in North Carolina
Colonial Revival architecture in North Carolina
Queen Anne architecture in North Carolina
Buildings and structures in Lee County, North Carolina
National Register of Historic Places in Lee County, North Carolina